Penne is a type of pasta.

Penne or Pennes may also refer to:

People
Penne Hackforth-Jones (born 1949), Australian actress and writer
Penne Percy Korth (born 1942), American diplomat
Lucas de Penna or Penne (c. 1325 – c. 1390), Neapolitan jurist
Luigi Durand de la Penne (1914–1992), Italian navy diver during World War II, later vice-admiral and politician
María Luisa Penne (1913–2005), Puerto Rican painter, artist, printer and educator
Harry H. Pennes (died 1963), American physician and clinical researcher

Places
 Penne, Tarn, a commune in the Tarn département, France
 La Penne, a commune in the Alpes-Maritimes department, France
 Penne, Abruzzo, a town and comune in the province of Pescara in central Italy
 Penser Joch, known as Passo di Pénnes in Italian, a mountain pass in northern Italy

Other
 Penne, a form of student cap in Belgium